The Municipal Borough of Kidderminster was a local government district in Worcestershire, that existed from 1835 to 1974. It was abolished in 1974 under the Local Government Act 1972, to form part of the Wyre Forest District.

References

Local government in Worcestershire
History of Worcestershire
Dudley